Sarah Carli (born 5 September 1994) is an Australian track and field athlete who specializes in the 400 metres hurdles. Representing Australia at the 2019 World Athletics Championships, she reached the semi finals in women's 400 metres hurdles.

Carli qualified for the Tokyo 2020 Olympics but was eliminated after finishing fifth in her heat of the women's 400m hurdles in 56:93 secs.

Early years 
Carli was aged eight when she joined Wollongong City Little Athletics with  her sister.  She has been running ever since.

When Carli was 16 years of age, in December 2010,  she won the Australian Schools 400m hurdles in time of 60.52. At the 2011 Australian championships she was placed second and secured selection for the World Youth Championships. At the championships she came second in the final clocking 58.05 seconds which was the fifth fastest in Australian junior history.

Achievements 
At the 2019 Canberra Track Classic Carli ran a 55.67, a 1.2 seconds personal best This also made her a Doha World Championships qualifier. Carli's win handed the first defeat in eight years to one of the greats of Australian 400m hurdling - Lauren Boden. She went on to be placed second Oceania Championships.

Carli continued to train in Wollongong and in her first hurdles of the season in December 2020 she ran a personal best of 55.09 and moved up to be the fourth fastest Australian of all time.

Accident 
In February 2021, Carli had a serious accident in the gym, severing the carotid artery in her neck when she slipped while lifting weights. Doctors performed emergency surgery using a vein from her thigh to repair it. Recovery was slow, but she resumed racing and in June 2021 she ran 58.53 qualifying her for the Tokyo 2020 Olympics.

Tokyo 2020 Olympic Games 
Competing in 400 metres hurdles at the Tokyo 2020 Olympics, Carli placed 5th in her heat and did not advance to the semi finals.

References.

External links

Australian female hurdlers
1994 births
Living people
World Athletics Championships athletes for Australia
Athletes (track and field) at the 2020 Summer Olympics
Olympic athletes of Australia